David W. Hess is a Republican member of the New Hampshire House of Representatives representing the 9th District since 1994.

External links
State of New Hampshire House of Representatives - David Hess
Project Vote Smart - Senator David Hess (NH) profile
Follow the Money - David Hess
2006 2004 2002 2000 1998 campaign contributions

Republican Party members of the New Hampshire House of Representatives
1942 births
Living people
Politicians from Allentown, Pennsylvania